Elliot M. Bour (born March 20, 1969, in Philadelphia, Pennsylvania) is an American director, animator and story artist working in film, television and commercials.

Filmography

Director
Star Wars: Young Jedi Adventures (2023)
 The Chicken Squad (2021)
Elena of Avalor (2016)
Pixie Hollow Bake Off (2013)
The Little Engine That Could (2011)
Kronk's New Groove (2005)
Pooh's Heffalump Halloween Movie (2005)
Winnie the Pooh: Springtime with Roo (2004)
Spy Groove (2000)

Animator
Mulan (1998)
Pocahontas (1995)
The Lion King (1994)
Trail Mix-Up (1993)
Aladdin (1992)
Beauty and the Beast (1991)

External links

 Elliot M. Bour Official Site

Film directors from Pennsylvania
American animated film directors
Animators from Pennsylvania
Walt Disney Animation Studios people
Living people
1969 births
Artists from Philadelphia